Grevillea globosa  is a species of flowering plant in the family Proteaceae and is endemic to the south-west of Western Australia. It is a spreading shrub with deeply divided leaves that have three to nine linear lobes, and dense, spherical clusters of pale green, creamy-green and reddish-brown flowers.

Description
Grevillea globosa is a spreading shrub that typically grows to a height of  but does not form a lignotuber.

Taxonomy
Grevillea globosa was first formally described by Charles Austin Gardner in 1964 in the Journal of the Royal Society of Western Australia from specimens collected by Fred Lullfitz to the north of Pindar. The specific epithet (globosa) means "spherical", referring to the flower clusters.

Distribution and habitat
This grevillea grows in mulga shrubland or mallee woodland between Lake Moore and near Pindar in the Avon Wheatbelt and Yalgoo biogeographic regions of south-western Western Australia.

Conservation status
Grevillea globosa is classified as "Priority Three" by the Government of Western Australia Department of Biodiversity, Conservation and Attractions, meaning that it is poorly known and known from only a few locations but is not under imminent threat.

References

globosa
Eudicots of Western Australia
Proteales of Australia
Plants described in 1964
Taxa named by Charles Gardner